Sylvio Hoffmann Mazzi (15 May 1908 – 15 November 1991) was a Brazilian football player. He has played for Brazil national team.

References 

1908 births
1991 deaths
Footballers from Rio de Janeiro (city)
Brazilian footballers
Brazilian expatriate footballers
Brazil international footballers
Peñarol players
Expatriate footballers in Uruguay
1934 FIFA World Cup players
Brazilian people of German descent
Brazilian people of Italian descent
Botafogo de Futebol e Regatas players
São Paulo FC players
Santos FC players
Fluminense FC players
CR Vasco da Gama players
Association football midfielders